Shashan or Koh-e-Shashan (Urdu: شاشان) is one of the highest mountains of Balochistan located in Gresha, Khuzdar District. the front side of Shashan is situated in Bidrang Area of Gresha and the back side ends in Hazar Ganji area of Nall Khuzdar, it's a very difficult mountain range similar to Tora Bora of Afghanistan, it has been a stronghold for insurgents of Khuzdar and Awaran, Districts of Balochistan, 
Mountains of Pakistan